Mandarina chichijimana is a species of air-breathing land snail, a terrestrial pulmonate gastropod mollusk in the family Camaenidae. This species is endemic to Japan.

References

Mandarina
Molluscs of Japan
Gastropods described in 1989
Taxonomy articles created by Polbot